Talizman were Japanese pop and rock band perhaps best known for performing the opening and closing songs of Ultraman 80 and the 1984 OVA Locke the Superman. They also did several songs for musicals such as the Japanese version of Hair. After the band broke up in 1981, Noboru Kimura, the vocalist of the band, operated under his stage name Harry Kimura, doing several anime and tokusatsu themes.

Members
 Noboru Kimura (vocals)
 Starting Nobuo (guitar, vocals)
 Tatsuki Satoshi Ishikawa (bass, vocals)
 Kenzi Zyou Snake (keyboards, vocals)
 Satoshi Ishii (drums)
 Asano Takashi (guitar)

Japanese new wave musical groups
Japanese rock music groups